Cibeber Station (CBB) is a class III railway station located in Cipetir, Cibeber, Cianjur Regency. The station, which is located at an altitude of +456 m, is included in the Bandung Operational Area II.

Services
The following is a list of train services at the Cibeber Station.

Passenger services
 Economy class
 Siliwangi, towards  and towards

References

External links
 

Cianjur Regency
Railway stations in West Java
Railway stations opened in 1883